"Get Your Dream" is the thirty-fifth single by the Japanese band Tokio and was released on June 21, 2006. It reached second place on the Oricon charts. The song "Get Your Dream" was used in Japan as the theme song for the 2006 FIFA World Cup.

Track listing
"Get Your Dream" was released in three different versions:

CD Normal Edition

Special Edition A

Special Edition B

References

2006 singles
Tokio (band) songs
2006 songs